Tonga – United States relations are bilateral relations between Tonga and the United States.

The United States and Tonga enjoy close cooperation on a range of international issues. Officers of the American Embassy in Suva, Fiji, are concurrently accredited to Tonga and make periodic visits since the United States has no permanent consular or diplomatic offices in Tonga. Peace Corps Volunteers teach and provide technical assistance to Tongans. Tonga has no embassy in Washington, DC, but has a permanent representative to the United Nations in New York, Fekitamoeloa 'Utoikamanu, who is also accredited as ambassador to the United States; however, there is a Tongan consulate-general in San Francisco. Many Tongans reside in the United States, particularly in Utah, California, Texas, and Hawaii.

On July 4, 2007, US Ambassador Larry Dinger noted the "close bilateral military relationship" between the two countries. Tonga is a member of the "Coalition of the Willing", and the Tonga Defence Services have deployed troops in Iraq.

The United States has urged Tonga to embrace a "suitably democratic future", but has stated that "Tonga’s issues are for Tonga to resolve". Hence the United States has put little or no pressure on Tonga, its military ally, to become a democracy.

Trade between the U.S. and Tonga is relatively low, but it has seen a steady increase in recent years. In 2001 U.S. exports to Tonga totaled US$4.8 million, and by 2005 they had increased to $10.78 million. In 2005, the U.S. imports from Tonga totaled $6.45 million.

Principal U.S. Embassy Officials include:
 Ambassador--Larry M. Dinger

See also
 Foreign relations of Tonga
 Foreign relations of the United States

External links
 History of Tonga - U.S. relations
 United States "virtual embassy" to Tonga
 Tongan Permanent Mission to the United Nations. Tonga's ambassador to the United Nations is accredited to the United States.

References 

 
Bilateral relations of the United States
United States